All Up 2 You is the second single by Aventura from their album The Last. The song features Akon and Wisin & Yandel. On April 23, they performed the song at the 2009 Latin Billboard Music Awards. Aventura member Romeo uses the auto-tune effect in his vocals. A merengue remix was made for the song. The song was also included on Wisin & Yandel's re-release album La Revolución: Evolution, and for the Mexican and Brazilian edition there is a remix featuring dancehall artist Adrian Banton. In Premios Lo Nuestro 2010, the song was nominated for Urban Song of the Year, losing to Tito el Bambino's "El Amor" and Collaboration of the Year losing to Luis Fonsi's "Aquí Estoy Yo". In 2011, Aventura released a greatest hits album exclusively for Spain in which included a remix version of the song in the same genre as a bonus track. This version did not include Akon and it was renamed "Vete".

Music video

Development
The music video was filmed in May 2009 in Mondrian Hotel in Miami Beach, Florida and was directed by Jessy Terrero. It was premiered on June 5, 2009.

Synopsis
The music video it starts when Romeo calls Lenny, Henry, Max by Aventura along with Wisin & Yandel to talk about a mysterious package, later it shows the artists singing on a white room and in other shots outside in a garden. Different areas of the hotel are shown throughout the video while the artists sing along.

Chart performance

References

Akon songs
Aventura (band) songs
Wisin & Yandel songs
2009 singles
Music videos directed by Jessy Terrero
Songs written by Akon
Songs written by Romeo Santos
Spanglish songs
Songs written by Wisin
Songs written by Yandel
Songs written by Tainy
2009 songs
Song recordings produced by Tainy